Ulrich Alexander Fox (born July 24, 1969) is a Canadian actor and former basketball player. He played in the National Basketball Association (NBA) for the Boston Celtics and Los Angeles Lakers, and played college basketball for the North Carolina Tar Heels. He was the owner of the eSports franchise Echo Fox until his departure from the franchise in October 2019.

His acting credits have included roles in Oz, He Got Game, One Tree Hill, Ugly Betty, The Game, Meet the Browns, Melrose Place, Mr. Box Office, Sin City Saints, Krystal, Sharknado, Greenleaf, Morning Show Mysteries and All Rise.

Early life
Fox was born in Toronto, the son of Dianne Gerace, who was an Olympic high jumper and women's pentathlete, and Ulrich Fox. His father is Bahamian and his mother is Canadian of Italian and Scottish descent. Fox's family moved to his father's native Bahamas when Fox was young. He attended Kingsway Academy in Nassau. Despite never playing organized ball before, he went to a summer camp and became a member of the high school's basketball team, the "Saints". Fox also played high school basketball in Warsaw, Indiana where he trained to excel. After two seasons (1984–1986) at Warsaw, Fox was projected to have a very successful senior season. Just prior to his senior season, the Indiana High School Athletic Association (IHSAA) ruled that he had no more high school eligibility left (due to completing eight semesters between the Bahamas and Indiana) and was not allowed to participate in any further IHSAA games. Despite not playing his senior season, Fox was voted onto the Indiana All-Star team in 1987. He then went on to star collegiately at the University of North Carolina where his highlights began his professional basketball career.

Professional career

Boston Celtics (1991–1997)
Fox was selected by the Boston Celtics in the first round (24th pick overall) of the 1991 NBA draft. As a member of the Celtics, Fox became the first rookie starter on opening night since Larry Bird in 1979 and made the 1992 NBA All-Rookie Second Team after averaging 8 points per game. By the 1995–96 season, Fox became the team's starting small forward and achieved double-figure scoring. He recorded career highs of 15.4 points a game and 2.2 steals a game (fifth in the league) and made 101 three-point field goals in the 1996–97 season.

Los Angeles Lakers (1997–2004)

In the summer of 1997, the Celtics released Fox, and he signed with the Los Angeles Lakers. He played and started in all 82 games during the 1997–98 season, averaging 12 points per game. In the playoffs, he tallied 10.9 points a game as the Lakers advanced to the Western Conference Finals before losing to the Utah Jazz. In the 1998–99 season, the Lakers acquired All-Star small forward Glen Rice. Fox primarily served as his backup during the next two seasons.

In the 1999–2000 season playoffs, Fox played all 23 games as the Lakers advanced to the 2000 NBA Finals against the Indiana Pacers. In the Finals, Fox averaged 6.7 points, including 11 in the Lakers' game 1 victory. In game 6, with the Lakers leading the series 3–2, Fox hit a critical three-pointer in the fourth quarter to help the Lakers' final rally as they won the game and the NBA title, Fox's first.

Following the departure of Glen Rice, Fox started 77 of 82 games in the 2000–01 season, posting an average of 9.6 points a game while shooting 39% from three-point range. In the playoffs, Fox started in all 16 games as the Lakers swept through the first three rounds and reached the 2001 NBA Finals against the Philadelphia 76ers. Fox scored 19 points in the Lakers' game 1 loss; the 76ers were led by Allen Iverson's 48 points. The Lakers would win the next four games of the series, securing their second straight championship. In the fifth game, Fox contributed with 20 points, and hit all three of his three-point field goal attempts.

In the 2001–02 season, Fox played and started in all 82 games in the regular season and in all of the Lakers' 19 playoff games. The Lakers faced a grueling 7-game series against the Sacramento Kings, with Fox scoring 13 points in the Lakers' game 7 victory in Sacramento.

In the 2002 NBA Finals against the New Jersey Nets, Fox averaged 9.8 points, 6.3 rebounds, and 1.5 steals as the Lakers swept the Nets in 4 games to win their third straight NBA title. In the beginning of the 2002 season, Fox was suspended 6 games after fighting with Sacramento Kings player Doug Christie in the preseason. In the 2002–03 season, Fox started in 75 of 76 games but suffered an ankle injury that kept him out of the last two games of the first round against the Minnesota Timberwolves and the entire Western Conference Semifinal series against the San Antonio Spurs. The Spurs defeated the Lakers 4–2. Fox missed 40 games in the 2003–04 season due to a foot injury, but started in 34 of 38 games while active. He would only start in 3 of 16 playoff games as the Lakers advanced to the 2004 NBA Finals but lost to the Detroit Pistons in 5 games. In 56 career NBA playoff games, Fox averaged 6.1 points per game, 2.6 rebounds, and 1.8 assists. Following the 2003–04 season, Fox was traded back to the Celtics in a deal that brought Chucky Atkins to the Lakers, but opted to retire instead of suiting up for the Celtics. During his 13-year NBA career, Fox earned more than $34 million in salary.

National team
Fox played internationally for Canada twice at the 1990 and 1994 FIBA World Championships.

Acting career

During NBA career
In 1994, Fox appeared in the film Blue Chips as a member of the Western University basketball team. In 1996, Fox then played the role of Terry Hastings in the film Eddie, a slumping basketball player who receives help from fan "Eddie" played by Whoopi Goldberg. Fox then had a role as the ladies man Chick Deagan in the 1998 film He Got Game, a film directed by Spike Lee. It was in 1997, however, that Fox received the biggest role of his early acting career playing prison inmate Jackson Vahue on the HBO prison drama Oz, appearing in 11 episodes of the show between 1997 and 2003. Vahue is a superstar basketball player imprisoned for charges related to a sexual assault charge. He subsequently develops and overcomes a major drug addiction. Fox first appeared on the episode "To Your Health" and each of the following episodes for the rest of the first season. His character would again appear at the beginning of the second season, before returning during the middle of the fourth season on the episode "Revenge is Sweet" and appearing on the duration of the season, as Vahue is nearing probation. His character's last appearance would come in the show's final season, on series finale "Exeunt Omnes", when Vahue is almost killed by the character Brass.

Fox was a supporting actor in the 1999 film Resurrection playing the role of Detective Scholfield and the role of Ray in the television film The Collectors. At the time, ESPN quoted Fox as saying of trying to balance his acting career with his sports career that, "I mean, Penny Marshall is courtside. You got Jack (Nicholson) and Denzel (Washington). The head of the William Morris Agency is there. (Ally McBeal creator) David E. Kelley comes to some games ... I want to jump into conversations with them, but I'm working!"

In addition to Oz, Fox appeared in three more television series in the year 2003. On the first season of the crime drama 1-800-Missing starring Vivica A. Fox, Rick Fox played the role of Eric Renard over five episodes. He also provided the voice of the characters Flash Williams and Smooth Daley on the Crime Wave/Odd Ball episode of Nickelodeon's animated series The Fairly OddParents, and played the role of Peter Sampson on the television series Street Time. As Eric Renard he played the love interest of the FBI agent Brooke Haslett, played by actress Gloria Reuben. That year he also appeared in the Walt Disney Pictures film Holes with the supporting character role of Clyde 'Sweetfeet' Livingston, a baseball player.

Post-NBA acting career

In 2005, Fox guest starred as the character Stephen Melbourne in the UPN television series Kevin Hill and appeared in Love, Inc. as the character David Marley. In 2006 Fox played the role of Fabrizio in the film Mini's First Time the same year he appeared in 5 episodes as villain Daunte in the CW drama series One Tree Hill, which has basketball as its central sport. In 2007, Fox played Wilhelmina Slater's bodyguard and lover Dwayne in the second season of Ugly Betty, opposite his former wife Vanessa Williams. The following year Fox signed on with the show Dirt to play a recurring role in a multi-episode storyline lasting six episodes playing the role of Prince Tyrese. In 2008 and 2009, he had a recurring role (as a fictionalized version of himself) on the BET comedy-drama television series The Game, also returning to reprise his role in the 2012 season finale. In 2008, Fox also had a lead role in Tyler Perry's Meet the Browns as Harry, a coach trying to court the character of Brenda played by Angela Bassett. 
In 2009, Fox played himself in Head Case, and he currently has recurring roles on VH1's Single Ladies and Tyler Perry's House of Payne. In 2010, Fox briefly guest starred on the science-fiction series Dollhouse, and took on a recurring role on the CW remake of Melrose Place. In 2011, Fox played the role of Bernadette's ex-boyfriend Glenn in The Big Bang Theory episode "The Love Car Displacement". In an article about his appearance, TV Guide quoted Fox as saying about his role, "It's all in Glenn's head now. 'How am I losing to this guy? He's smarter than me ... I love that they turned the 'threatening ex' on its ear. At the end of the day, I have more insecurity about my intellect and am constantly fighting to be accepted intellectually and be seen for more than my looks and my size. I want to appear intelligent and prove my intelligence. That's where I'm battling with him."

In 2011, Fox also played a suspect on the crime drama Body of Proof and in 2012 he played the character Andre Carson on the series Franklin & Bash. He also played the recurring role of Winston on Single Ladies and Andrew Thompson in the series Mr. Box Office.

In 2013, Fox played the role of Chase Vincent in the VH1 series Hit the Floor. In 2014, Fox guest-starred as the character Dr. James Kendall in the CBS television series Mom. On the same airdate, he appeared as himself on an episode of the CBS sitcom The McCarthys. In 2015, Fox played the role of Sam Johnson, the general manager for the eponymous basketball team on Yahoo's original series Sin City Saints, he appeared in the TV film Sharknado 3: Oh Hell No!, and played retired basketball player Calvin Owens on iZombie. In 2016, Fox also appeared in the Showtime original series Shameless.

From 2018 to 2019, Fox co-starred in the first five instalments of Hallmark's Morning Show Mysteries, based on the novels of Al Roker. In 2019 he played the role of "Roger" in the holiday TV movie One Fine Christmas. He played the role of journalist Darius Nash on the OWN series Greenleaf.

In 2022, the Bahamian government appointed Fox as Ambassador-at-large for Sports.

Reality television
In late 2010, Fox was a celebrity contestant on ABC's Dancing With The Stars, pairing with pro Cheryl Burke. They came in sixth place. He was also host of the Jace Hall Show for five episodes. Fox appeared as a contestant on Are You Smarter than a Fifth Grader?, in season 3. He was a special guest judge during season 4 of RuPaul's Drag Race. And in 2017, Fox was a contestant on the Chopped Star Power actors competition. Fox came in second place.

Professional gaming

In 2015, Fox and partner Amit Raizada acquired professional League of Legends team Gravity Gaming of the North American League of Legends Championship Series, re-branding it to Echo Fox.

In April 2019 Echo Fox confirmed to ESPN that Amit Raizada, one of its co-founders, had used racist language multiple times, including in a confrontation with Fox. 

In response, Riot Games, which operates the LCS, launched an investigation. It ordered Echo Fox to remove Razaida, or it would have to sell its spot in the LCS within 60 days, saying "hate speech, threats, and bigotry have no place in the LCS." Riot Games came up with an agreement to end Echo Fox's participation in the LCS, eventually resulting in Evil Geniuses acquiring the team's spot. With Echo Fox unable to remove Razaida, Fox notified Echo Fox shareholders that he would be exiting the organization as soon as he could facilitate a transaction. In an email, obtained by Dexerto, Fox said: “the recent outrageous and abhorrent display of pure racism made by a significant Echo Fox shareholder as well as threats to my family have made it impossible for me to continue remain associated with the company.”

In a statement in November 2019, Fox confirmed he had left the organization. “On the [basketball] court and in the business world, teammates are everything and there must be unity and a shared sense of purpose in order to succeed. In the case of Echo Fox, the significant difference of values, ethics and commitment to integrity was very problematic and damaging”, Fox said.

Personal life
Fox has a son named Kyle, who was born 1994 with Kari Hillsman, a woman he dated while playing basketball for the Boston Celtics. Kyle is an avid gamer and got his father into the eSports world.

Fox eloped with American actress/singer Vanessa Williams in the summer of 1999 in the Caribbean. They had another ceremony in September 1999 in New York City. They had a daughter born in May 2000. In August 2004, Fox filed for divorce from Williams. Fox and Williams' split however was amicable enough for the two of them to work onscreen together several years later on the television show Ugly Betty.

Fox and actress Eliza Dushku dated from October 2009 to June 2014.

NBA career statistics

Regular season

|-
| style="text-align:left;"|
| style="text-align:left;"|Boston
| 81 || 5 || 19.0 || .459 || .329 || .755 || 2.7 || 1.6 || 1.0 || .4 || 8.0
|-
| style="text-align:left;"|
| style="text-align:left;"|Boston
| 71 || 14 || 15.2 || .484 || .174 || .802 || 2.2 || 1.6 || .9 || .3 || 6.4
|-
| style="text-align:left;"|
| style="text-align:left;"|Boston
| 82 || 53 || 25.6 || .467 || .330 || .757 || 4.3 || 2.6 || 1.0 || .6 || 10.8
|-
| style="text-align:left;"|
| style="text-align:left;"|Boston
| 53 || 7 || 19.6 || .481 || .413 || .772 || 2.9 || 2.6 || 1.0 || .4 || 8.8
|-
| style="text-align:left;"|
| style="text-align:left;"|Boston
| 81 || 81 || 32.0 || .454 || .364 || .772 || 5.6 || 4.6 || 1.4 || .5 || 14.0
|-
| style="text-align:left;"|
| style="text-align:left;"|Boston
| 76 || 75 || 42.9 || .456 || .363 || .787 || 5.2 || 3.8 || 2.2 || .5 || 15.4
|-
| style="text-align:left;"|
| style="text-align:left;"|L.A. Lakers
| 82 || 82 || 33.0 || .471 || .325 || .743 || 4.4 || 3.4 || 1.2 || .6 || 12.0
|-
| style="text-align:left;"|
| style="text-align:left;"|L.A. Lakers
| 44 || 1 || 21.5 || .448 || .337 || .742 || 2.0 || 2.0 || .6 || .2 || 9.0
|-
| style="text-align:left; background:#afe6ba;"|
| style="text-align:left;"|L.A. Lakers
| 82 || 1 || 18.0 || .414 || .326 || .808 || 2.4 || 1.7 || .6 || .3 || 6.5
|-
| style="text-align:left; background:#afe6ba;"|
| style="text-align:left;"|L.A. Lakers
| 82 || 77 || 27.9 || .444 || .393 || .779 || 4.0 || 3.2 || .9 || .4 || 9.6
|-
| style="text-align:left; background:#afe6ba;"|
| style="text-align:left;"|L.A. Lakers
| 82 || 82 || 27.9 || .421 || .313 || .824 || 4.7 || 3.5 || .8 || .3 || 7.9
|-
| style="text-align:left;"|
| style="text-align:left;"|L.A. Lakers
| 76 || 75 || 28.7 || .422 || .375 || .754 || 4.3 || 3.3 || .9 || .2 || 9.0
|-
| style="text-align:left;"|
| style="text-align:left;"|L.A. Lakers
| 38 || 34 || 22.3 || .392 || .246 || .733 || 2.7 || 2.6 || .8 || .1 || 4.8
|- class="sortbottom"
| style="text-align:center;" colspan="2"|Career
| 930 || 587 || 25.5 || .450 || .349 || .770 || 3.8 || 2.8 || 1.0 || .4 || 9.6

Playoffs

|-
| style="text-align:left;"|1992
| style="text-align:left;"|Boston
| 8 || 0 || 8.4 || .478 || .500 || 1.000 || .8 || .5 || .3 || .3 || 3.6
|-
| style="text-align:left;"|1993
| style="text-align:left;"|Boston
| 4 || 0 || 17.8 || .280 || .333 || 1.000 || 4.8 || 1.3 || .5 || .3 || 4.3
|-
| style="text-align:left;"|1998
| style="text-align:left;"|L.A. Lakers
| 13 || 13 || 32.9|| .447 || .396 || .826 || 4.5 || 3.9 || .8 || .2 || 10.9
|-
| style="text-align:left;"|1999
| style="text-align:left;"|L.A. Lakers
| 8 || 1 || 22.6 || .400 || .190 || 1.000 || 2.8 || 1.5 || .5 || .6 || 6.6
|-
| style="text-align:left; background:#afe6ba;"|2000
| style="text-align:left;"|L.A. Lakers
| 23 || 0 || 14.4 || .452 || .462 || .762 || 1.7 || 1.2 || .4 || .0 || 4.3
|-
| style="text-align:left; background:#afe6ba;"|2001
| style="text-align:left;"|L.A. Lakers
| 16 || 16 || 35.8 || .450 || .316 || .867 || 4.9 || 3.6 || 1.9 || .4 || 10.0
|-
| style="text-align:left; background:#afe6ba;"|2002
| style="text-align:left;"|L.A. Lakers
| 19 || 19 || 34.3 || .482 || .349 || .755 || 5.4 || 3.4 || 1.1 || .3 || 9.8
|-
| style="text-align:left;"|2003
| style="text-align:left;"|L.A. Lakers
| 4 || 4 || 19.8 || .444 || .500 || .750 || 1.5 || 1.8 || .3 || .3 || 6.0
|-
| style="text-align:left;"|2004
| style="text-align:left;"|L.A. Lakers
| 16 || 3 || 9.1 || .400 || .143 || .500 || 1.4 || 1.1 || .2 || .1 || 1.1
|- class="sortbottom"
| style="text-align:center;" colspan="2"|Career
| 111 || 56 || 22.8 || .444 || .360 || .801 || 3.2 || 2.2 || .8 || .2 || 6.6

Filmography

Film

Television

Dancing with the Stars

Fox was paired with two-time DWTS winner Cheryl Burke for Season 11. The couple was eliminated on November 2, 2010, ending the competition in sixth place.

Season 11 performances

See also

List of Canadian sports personalities

References

External links

 
 
 Rick Fox Producer Profile for The 1 Second Film

1969 births
Living people
1990 FIBA World Championship players
1994 FIBA World Championship players
20th-century Canadian male actors
21st-century Canadian male actors
Bahamian expatriate basketball people in the United States
Bahamian male film actors
Bahamian men's basketball players
Basketball players from Toronto
Black Canadian basketball players
Black Canadian male actors
Boston Celtics draft picks
Boston Celtics players
Businesspeople from Toronto
Canadian expatriate basketball people in the United States
Canadian expatriate male actors in the United States
Canadian male film actors
Canadian male television actors
Canadian men's basketball players
Canadian people of Bahamian descent
Canadian people of Italian descent
Canadian people of Scottish descent
Echo Fox
Esports team owners
Los Angeles Lakers players
Male actors from Toronto
National Basketball Association players from Canada
National Basketball Association players from the Bahamas
North Carolina Tar Heels men's basketball players
Shooting guards
Small forwards
Sportspeople from Nassau, Bahamas